James Hudson Taylor (21 May 1832 – 3 June 1905) was a British Baptist Christian missionary to China and founder of the China Inland Mission (CIM, now OMF International). Taylor spent 54 years in China. The society that he began was responsible for bringing over 800 missionaries to the country who started 125 schools and directly resulted in 20,000 Christian conversions, as well as the establishment of more than 300 stations of work with more than 499 local helpers in all eighteen provinces.

Taylor was known for his sensitivity to Chinese culture and zeal for evangelism. He adopted wearing native Chinese clothing even though this was rare among missionaries of that time.  Under his leadership, the CIM was singularly non-denominational in practice and accepted members from all Protestant groups, including individuals from the working class, and single women as well as multinational recruits. Primarily because of the CIM's campaign against the opium trade, Taylor has been referred to as one of the most significant Europeans to visit China in the 19th century.  Historian Ruth Tucker summarizes the theme of his life:

Taylor was able to preach in several varieties of Chinese, including Mandarin, Chaozhou, and the Wu dialects of Shanghai and Ningbo. The last of these he knew well enough to help prepare a colloquial edition of the New Testament written in it.

Youth and early work

Taylor was born on 21 May 1832 in Barnsley, Yorkshire, the son of a chemist (pharmacist) and Methodist lay preacher James Taylor and his wife, Amelia (Hudson), but as a young man he ran away from the Christian beliefs of his parents. At the age of 16, after reading an evangelistic tract pamphlet entitled "Poor Richard", he professed faith in Christ, and in December 1849, he committed himself to going to China as a missionary.
At this time he came into contact with Edward Cronin of Kensington—one of the members of the first missionary party of the Plymouth Brethren to Baghdad. It is believed that Taylor learned his faith mission principles from his contact with the Brethren. Taylor was able to borrow a copy of China: Its State and Prospects by Walter Henry Medhurst, which he quickly read. About this time, he began studying the languages of Mandarin, Greek, Hebrew, and Latin.

In 1851, he moved to a poor neighborhood in Kingston upon Hull to be a medical assistant with Robert Hardey, and began preparing himself for a life of faith and service, devoting himself to the poor and exercising faith that God would provide for his needs. He practiced distributing gospel tracts and open-air preaching among the poor. He was baptized by Andrew John Jukes of the Plymouth Brethren in the Hull Brethren Assembly in 1852, and convinced his sister Amelia to also take adult baptism.

In 1852 he began studying medicine at the Royal London Hospital in Whitechapel, London, as preparation for working in China. The great interest awakened in England about China through the civil war, which was then erroneously supposed to be a mass movement toward Christianity, together with the glowing but exaggerated reports made by Karl Gützlaff concerning China's accessibility, led to the founding of the Chinese Evangelisation Society, to the service of which Hudson Taylor offered himself as their first missionary.

First visit to China

Taylor left England on 19 September 1853 before completing his medical studies, departing from Liverpool and arriving in Shanghai, China, on 1 March 1854. The nearly disastrous voyage aboard the clipper Dumfries through an Easterly passage near Buru Island lasted about five months. In China, he was immediately faced with civil war, throwing his first year there into turmoil.

Taylor made 18 preaching tours in the vicinity of Shanghai starting in 1855, and was often poorly received by the people, even though he brought with him medical supplies and skills. He made a decision to adopt the native Chinese clothes and queue (pigtail) with shaven forehead, and was then able to gain an audience without creating a disturbance. Previous to this, Taylor realised that wherever he went he was being referred to as a "black devil" because of the overcoat he wore. He distributed thousands of Chinese Gospel tracts and portions of Scripture in and around Shanghai. During his stay in Shanghai, he also adopted and cared for a Chinese boy named Hanban.

Scottish evangelist, William Chalmers Burns, of the English Presbyterian Mission began work in Shantou, and for a period Taylor joined him there. After leaving he later found that all of his medical supplies, being stored in Shanghai, had been destroyed by a fire. Then in October 1856, while traveling across China he was robbed of nearly everything he owned.

Relocated in Ningbo by 1857, Taylor received a letter from a supportive George Müller which led to Taylor and his co-worker John Jones deciding to resign from the problematic mission board which had sent them, and instead work independently in what came to be called the "Ningbo Mission". Four Chinese men joined them in their work: Ni Yongfa, Feng Ninggui, Wang Laijun, and Qiu Guogui.

In 1858, Taylor married Maria Jane Dyer, the orphaned daughter of the Rev. Samuel Dyer of the London Missionary Society, who had been a pioneer missionary to the Chinese in Penang, Malaysia. Hudson met Maria in Ningbo where she lived and worked at a school for girls which was run by one of the first female missionaries to the Chinese, Mary Ann Aldersey and they were married at the British Consulate there.

As a married couple the Taylors took care of an adopted boy named Tianxi while living in Ningbo. They had a baby of their own that died late in 1858. Their first surviving child, Grace, was born in 1859. Shortly after she was born, the Taylors took over all of the operations at the hospital in Ningbo that had been run by William Parker. In a letter to his sister Amelia Hudson Taylor he wrote on 14 February 1860, 

Because of health problems, in 1860 Taylor decided to return to England for a furlough with his family. The Taylors sailed back to England aboard the tea clipper Jubilee  along with their daughter, Grace and a young man, Wang Laijun, from the Bridge Street church in Ningbo, who would help with the Bible translation work that would continue in England.

Family and China Inland Mission

Taylor used his time in England to continue his work, in company with Frederick Foster Gough of the Church Mission Society translating the New Testament into a Romanised Ningbo dialect for the British and Foreign Bible Society. He completed his diploma (and a course in midwifery) at the Royal London Hospital with the Royal College of Surgeons in 1862, and with Maria's help, wrote a book called China's Spiritual Need and Claims in 1865 which was instrumental in generating sympathy for China and volunteers for the mission field, who began to go out in 1862, the first being James Joseph Meadows. In the book Taylor wrote:

He travelled extensively around the British Isles speaking at churches and promoting the needs of China. At home in the East End of London he also ministered at Newgate Prison. During this time he became friends with Charles Haddon Spurgeon, who pastored the Metropolitan Tabernacle and became a lifelong supporter of Taylor. Also, the Taylors hosted the young Thomas John Barnardo at their house as a potential missionary candidate between 1865 and 1866.

Their second child, Herbert, was born in London in 1861. More children were born to the Taylors, in 1862 Frederick, in 1864 Samuel, and in 1865 Jane, who died at birth.

On 25 June 1865, at Brighton, Taylor definitely dedicated himself to God for the founding of a new society to undertake the evangelisation of the "unreached" inland provinces of China. He founded the China Inland Mission together with William Thomas Berger shortly thereafter. In less than one year, they had accepted 21 missionaries and raised over £2,000 (about £181,800 in 2018 terms). In early 1866 Taylor published the first edition of the Occasional Paper of the China Inland Mission which later became China's Millions.

The following summary by Taylor came to be held as the core values of the CIM in what came to be a classic description of future faith missions:

In 1866 he and the missionaries went to China. They set out on 26 May 1866, after more than five years of working in England, Taylor and family set sail for China with their new missions team "the Lammermuir Party" aboard the tea clipper Lammermuir. A four-month voyage was considered speedy at the time. While in the South China Sea and also the Pacific Ocean the ship was nearly wrecked but survived two typhoons. They arrived safely in Shanghai on 30 September 1866.

Return to China
The arrival of the largest party of missionaries ever sent to China, as well as their intent to be dressed in native clothing, gave the foreign settlement in Shanghai much to talk about and some criticism began for the young China Inland Mission. The party donned Chinese clothing, notwithstanding, even the women missionaries, which was deemed semi-scandalous at the time. When other missionaries sought to preserve their British ways, Taylor was convinced that the Gospel would only take root on Chinese soil if missionaries were willing to affirm the culture of the people they were seeking to reach. He argued, from the example of the Apostle Paul, that in everything "not sinful" missionaries should become like the Chinese, "that by all means we may save some."

They travelled down the Grand Canal of China to make the first settlement in the war-torn city of Hangzhou. Another daughter was born to them in China (Maria Hudson Taylor). Taylor began practising much sought-after medical work and preaching every day under an exhausting schedule. Hundreds came to hear and be treated.

Conflicts within the Lammermuir team limited their effectiveness, but when Taylor's daughter Grace died of meningitis in 1867, they united for a time and sorted out their discord after witnessing Taylor place the cares of his fellow missionaries above even the concern that he had for his ailing daughter. Many of the Lammermuir crew were converted to Christianity.

Riot in Yangzhou
In 1868 the Taylors took a party of missionaries up to Yangzhou to start a new work. But problems continued in 1868, when their mission premises were attacked, looted and burned during the Yangzhou riot. Despite the violence and injuries, no one was killed. Unfortunately, the international outrage at the Chinese for the attack on these British nationals (and the subsequent arrival of the Royal Navy) caused also the China Inland Mission and Taylor to be criticised in the British press for almost starting a war. Taylor never requested military intervention, but some voices in the British Parliament called for "the withdrawal of all missionaries from China". However, the Taylors returned to Yangzhou later that year to continue in the work and many converts to Christianity were made.

In 1869 Hudson was influenced by a passage on personal holiness from a book called "Christ Is All" by Henry Law that was sent to him by a fellow missionary, John McCarthy. "The Lord Jesus received is holiness begun; the Lord Jesus cherished is holiness advancing; the Lord Jesus counted upon as never absent would be holiness complete." This new understanding of continually abiding in Christ endured for the rest of his life. At the time, he was quoted by fellow missionary Charles Henry Judd as saying: "Oh, Mr. Judd, God has made me a new man!" Taylor later sent out "How to live on Christ", a booklet by Harriet Beecher Stowe, that first appeared as an introduction to "Religion As It Should Be", a book written by Christopher Dean and published in 1847.

Loss of Maria

In 1868 another child, Charles, was born into the Taylor family, and in 1870, Taylor and his wife made the difficult decision to send their older three surviving children (Bertie, Freddie, and Maria—Samuel died earlier that year) home to England with Miss Emily Blatchley. In July, Noel was born, though he died of malnutrition and deprivation two weeks later due to Maria's inability to nurse him. Maria herself died several days later, with the official cause of death being cholera. Her death shook Taylor deeply, and in 1871, his own health began deteriorating further, leading to his return to England later that year to recuperate and take care of business items.

Back in England, Taylor was married to Jane Elizabeth Faulding who had been a fellow missionary since 1866. Hudson and "Jennie" returned to China in late 1872 aboard the MM Tigre. They were in Nanjing when Jennie gave birth to stillborn twins—a boy and a girl in 1873. Two years later, the Taylors were forced to return once again to England because of the death of the mission secretary and their children's caretaker, Emily Blatchley.

During the winter of 1874 and 1875 Taylor was practically paralysed from a fall he had taken on a river boat while in China. In this state of crippling physical hindrance, Taylor confidently published an appeal for 18 new workers to join the work. When he did recover his strength, Jennie remained with the children, (including a new son and daughter, Ernest Hamilton and Amy, as well as the orphaned daughter of fellow missionary George Duncan) while in 1876 Hudson Taylor returned to China, followed by the 18 requested missionaries. Meanwhile, in England, the work of General Secretary of the China Inland Mission was done by Benjamin Broomhall, who had married Hudson's sister, Amelia.

It was at this time that Hudson's evangelical work in England profoundly affected various members of the famous cricketing Studd family, resulting in three of the brothers converting and becoming deeply religious themselves; one of them, cricketer Charles Studd, became a missionary to China along with fellow Cambridge University converts, known as the Cambridge Seven.

From 1876 to 1878 Taylor travelled throughout inland China, opening missions stations. This was made possible by the signing on 13 September 1876 of the Chefoo Convention, a settlement between Britain and China that made it possible for missionary work to take place legally in inland China. In 1878, Jennie returned to China and began working to promote female missionary service there.   Their son Ernest Hamilton Taylor joined them at the China Inland Mission in 1898 where he remained as a missionary for much of his working life.  By 1881 there were 100 missionaries in the CIM.

Taylor returned to England in 1883 to recruit more missionaries speaking of China's needs, and returned to China, working now with a total of 225 missionaries and 59 churches. In 1887 their numbers increased by another 102 with The Hundred missionaries, and in 1888, Taylor brought 14 missionaries from the United States. In the US he travelled and spoke at many places, including the Niagara Bible Conference where he befriended Cyrus Scofield and later Taylor filled the pulpit of Dwight Lyman Moody as a guest in Chicago. Moody and Scofield thereafter actively supported the work of the China Inland Mission of North America.

In 1897 Hudson's and Maria's only surviving daughter, Maria died in Wenzhou, leaving four little children and her missionary husband, John Joseph Coulthard . She had been instrumental in leading many Chinese women to Christianity during her short life.

Boxer crisis
News of the Boxer Rebellion and the resulting disruption of missionary work in 1900 distressed Taylor, even though it led to further interest in missions in the area and additional growth of his China Inland Mission. Though the CIM suffered more than any other mission in China (58 missionaries, 21 children were killed), Taylor refused to accept payment for loss of property or life, to show the 'meekness and gentleness of Christ'. He was criticised by some but was commended by the British Foreign Office, whose minister in Beijing donated £200 to the CIM, expressing his 'admiration' and sympathy. The Chinese were also touched by Taylor's attitude.

Final years
Due to health issues, Taylor remained in Switzerland, semi-retired with his wife. In 1900, Dixon Edward Hoste was appointed the Acting General Director of the CIM, and in 1902, Taylor formally resigned. His wife, Jennie, died of cancer in 1904 in Les Chevalleyres, Switzerland, and in 1905, Taylor returned to China for the eleventh and final time. There he visited Yangzhou and Zhenjiang and other cities, before dying suddenly while reading at home in Changsha. He was buried next to his first wife, Maria, in Zhenjiang, in the small English Cemetery near the Yangtze River.

The small cemetery was built over with industrial buildings in the 1960s and the grave markers were destroyed. However, the marker for Hudson Taylor was stored away in a local museum for years. His great-grandson, James Hudson Taylor III, found the marker and was able to help a local Chinese church re-erect it within their building in 1999.

His re-erected tombstone reads:

In 2013 the land for the cemetery was re-developed and the demolition of the old industrial buildings revealed that the Taylors' tombs were still intact. On 28 August the graves were excavated with the surrounding soil and moved to a local church where they were to be reburied in a memorial garden. The Gravestone was underground in a pit where the church was awaiting construction of a proper memorial hall. A dedication marker was outside under a tarp, covered up unless visitors know it is there. It was in the possession of 宣德堂(镇江市) as of July 2016.

Legacy
The beginning of "faith missions" (the sending of missionaries with no promises of temporal support, but instead a reliance "through prayer to move Men by God") has had a wide impact among evangelical churches to this day. After his death, China Inland Mission gained the notable distinction of being the largest Protestant mission agency in the world. The biographies of Hudson Taylor inspired generations of Christians to follow his example of service and sacrifice.  Notable examples are: missionary to India Amy Carmichael, Olympic Gold Medalist Eric Liddell, twentieth-century missionary and martyr Jim Elliot, founder of Bible Study Fellowship Audrey Wetherell Johnson, as well as international evangelists Billy Graham and Luis Palau.

Descendants of James Hudson Taylor continued his full-time ministry into the 21st century in Chinese communities in East Asia. James Hudson Taylor III (1929–2009) in Hong Kong, and his son, James Hudson Taylor IV 戴繼宗, who married Yeh Min Ke (the first Taiwanese member of the Taylor family), who is involved in full-time ministries in Taiwan. James H. Taylor V continued the family legacy by singing with a middle school choir.

Chinese tourists have started visiting his home town of Barnsley to see where their hero grew up and the town is planning a trail to guide visitors to landmarks around the town.

Beliefs 
Taylor was raised in the Methodist tradition but in the course of his life he was a member of the Baptist Westbourne Grove Church pastored by William Garrett Lewis, and he also kept strong ties to the "Open Brethren" such as George Müller.

Chronology

Birth to age 21, (1832 to 1853)
Born 21 May 1832 in Barnsley, England
Converted to Christianity June 1849 in Barnsley
Began medical studies, in hopes of going to China, May 1850 in Kingston upon Hull
Baptised 1851 in Kingston upon Hull
Moved 2 September 1852 to London

First time in China (1854)
Sailed for China aboard the Dumfries as an agent of the Chinese Evangelisation Society 19 September 1853 in Liverpool, Lancashire, England
The Dumfries arrived 1 March 1854 in Shanghai, China
Seven months with the William Chalmers Burns 1855–56
Sailed to Shantou (Swatow), Guangdong, China aboard the "Geelong" 12 March 1856
Moved October 1856 in Ningbo, Zhejiang, China
Resigned from the Chinese Evangelisation Society June 1857 in Ningbo
Ningbo Mission started after June 1857 in Ningbo
Married Maria Jane Dyer, 20 January 1858 in Presbyterian Compound, Ningbo
Grace Dyer Taylor born 31 July 1859 in Ningbo Mission House
Undertook charge of William Parker's hospital with Maria, September 1859 outside Salt Gate, Ningbo
Made first appeal to England for helpers 16 January 1860 in Ningbo

Life in London (1860 to 1866)
Sailed to England (via the Cape of Good Hope) on furlough aboard the Jubliee with Maria, Grace and Wang Laijun, 19 July 1860 in Shanghai. The Jubliee arrived 20 November 1860 in Gravesend, England
Settled 20 November 1860 in 63 Westbourne Grove, Bayswater, London
Completed the revision of a version of the New Testament in the colloquial of Ningbo for the British and Foreign Bible Society 1860–65
Herbert Hudson Taylor born 3 April 1861 in 63 Westbourne Grove, Bayswater, London
Moved after 9 April 1861 to 1 Beaumont Street, London
Earned diploma of Member of the Royal College of Surgeons 1862 in Royal London Hospital, London
Frederick Howard Taylor born 25 November 1862 in 1 Beaumont Street, Mile End Road, London
Samuel Dyer Taylor born 24 June 1864 in Barnsley, Yorkshire
Moved 6 October 1864 to 30 Coborn Street, London
The China Inland Mission is founded, 25 June 1865 in Brighton Beach, Sussex
China's Spiritual Need and Claims published, October 1865 in London
Occasional Paper of the China Inland Mission Number 1 is published, 12 March 1866 in London

Return to China (1866 to 1871)
 Sailed to China (via the Cape of Good Hope) aboard the Lammermuir with Maria and four children, 26 May 1866 in East India Docks, London. Arrived aboard the Lammermuir 29 September 1866 in Shanghai, China
Settled with the Lammermuir Party, December 1866 in 1 Xin Kai Long (New Lane), Hangzhou, Zhejiang
Maria Hudson Taylor born 3 February 1867 in 1 Xin Kai Long (New Lane), Hangzhou
 Daughter Grace Dyer Taylor died 23 August 1867 in a temple at Pengshan, near Hangzhou
Survived riot with Maria, 22 August 1868 in Yangzhou
Charles Edward Taylor born 29 November 1868 in Yangzhou
 Entered into "The Exchanged Life": – "God has made me a new man!" 4 September 1869
Son Samuel Dyer Taylor died 4 February 1870 aboard a boat in the Yangtze River near Zhenjiang
Noel Taylor born 7 July 1870 in Zhenjiang
Son Noel died 13 days after birth 20 July 1870 in Zhenjiang
Maria Jane Dyer died 23 July 1870 in Zhenjiang

Furlough and remarriage (1871 to 1872)
Sailed to Marseilles on furlough via Saigon, Ceylon, Aden, Suez aboard the MM Ava after 5 August 1871 in Guangzhou, Guangdong, China. Arrived in England 25 September 1871 from Marseilles, France (via Paris to London)
 Married to Jane Elizabeth Faulding, 28 November 1871 in Regent's Park Chapel, London
Moved 15 January 1872 to 6 Pyrland Road, Islington, London

Third time in China (1872 to 1874)
Sailed to China aboard the M M Tigre with Jennie, 9 October 1872 from Marseilles, France (via Paris from London). M M Tigre arrived 28 November 1872 in Shanghai, China
Baby son (twin) Taylor born 13 April 1873 in Nanjing, Jiangsu, China
Baby daughter (twin) Taylor born 14 April 1873 in Nanjing, Jiangsu, China
Fell from steps in a river boat and hurt spine May 1874 in China

Recovering in England (1874 to 1876)
 Sailed to England on furlough with Jennie, 30 August 1874. Arrived 15 October 1874 in England
Paralyzed during winter 1874–75 in London
An appeal for eighteen workers published January 1875 in London
Ernest Hamilton Taylor born 7 January 1875 at 2 Pyrland Road, Islington
 .
Amy Hudson Taylor born 7 April 1876 in Islington
Ernest (died 1948) and Amy (died 1953) are buried in the same grave plot at the Kent & Sussex Cemetery, Royal Tunbridge Wells

Fourth time in China (1876 to 1877) 
Sailed to China 8 September 1876. Arrived 22 October 1876 in China
General Missionary Conference 10 May 1877 in Shanghai, China
Sailed to England 9 November 1877. Arrived 20 December 1877 in England

Fifth time in China (1879 to 1883) 
Sailed to China 24 February 1879. Arrived 22 April 1879 in China
First visit August 1880 in Guangxin River, Jiangxi
Left for England 6 February 1883 in Yantai (Chefoo)
Sailed to England on furlough 10 February 1883. Arrived 27 March 1883 in England

Sixth time in China (1885 to 1888) 
Sailed to China 20 January 1885. Arrived 3 March 1885 in China
Second visit May 1886 in Guangxin (Kwangsin) River, Jiangxi
Pastor Hsi set apart 5 August 1886 in Shanxi
First meeting of China Council, Appeal for "The Hundred missionaries" 13 November 1886 in China
Sailed to England 9 January 1887. Arrived 18 February 1887 in England
Addressed the Keswick Convention after February 1887 in Keswick, England
Sailed to US aboard the  23 June 1888. Arrived 1 July 1888 in New York City, attended Niagara Bible Conference and crossed the continent on the Canadian Pacific Railway.

Seventh time in China (1888 to 1889) 
Sailed to China from Vancouver, Canada via Yokohama, Japan 5 October 1888. Arrived 30 October 1888 in Shanghai, China
Sailed to England via France 12 April 1889. Arrived in England 21 May 1889
Arrived 6 July 1889 in New York City
Sailed to England 17 August 1889. Arrived 24 August 1889 in England
 .

Eighth time in China (1890 to 1892) 
 Sailed to China 17 March 1890 in Shanghai, China. Arrived 27 April 1890 in Shanghai, China
Preached opening sermon at General Missionary Conference 7 May 1890 in Shanghai, China
Sailed to Australia 26 August 1890. Sailed to China 20 November 1890. Arrived 21 December 1890 in Shanghai, China
Arrived with Jennie, March 1892 in Vancouver, British Columbia, Canada
Sailed to England via Canada with Jennie, 10 May 1892. Arrived with Jennie, 26 July 1892 in England
Addressed the Keswick Convention 1893 in Keswick, England
Union and Communion published 1893 in England
A Retrospect autobiography published 1894 in England
Provided testimony to the Royal Commission on Opium as an opponent of the trade before 14 February 1894 in England

Ninth time in China (1894 to 1896) 
Sailed to China via US aboard the RMS Germanic with Jennie, 14 February 1894 in Liverpool and Queenstown, England
Arrived aboard the RMS Germanic with Jennie, 24 February 1894 in Ellis Island, New York
Spoke at Students' Conference after 24 February 1894 in Detroit, Michigan. Arrived with Jennie, 17 April 1894 in Shanghai, China
Sailed aboard the Oceania (M. M. Oceanien?) with Jennie, 2 May 1896. Arrived, 17 June 1896 in England
 Addressed the Keswick Convention after 17 June 1896 in Keswick, England
Daughter Maria Hudson Taylor died 28 September 1897 in Wenzhou, Zhejiang, China
Sailed to US with Jennie, 24 November 1897. Arrived with Jennie, 18 December 1897 in US
Separation and Service published 1898 in England

Tenth time in China (1898 to 1899) 
Arrived with Jennie, 15 January 1898 in Shanghai, China
A Ribband of Blue, and other Bible Studies published 1899 in England
Conference, 16 January 1899 in Chongqing, Sichuan, China
Attended China Council meetings 28 June 1899 in Shanghai
Sailed to Australia, New Zealand, and US with Jennie, 25 September 1899. Arrived, 5 April 1900 in San Francisco, US
Addressed the Ecumenical Missions Conference after 5 April 1900 in Carnegie Hall, New York City
Sailed to England from US with Jennie as the Boxer Uprising was beginning in China, 9 June 1900. Arrived, 19 June 1900 in England
Retired with Jennie, after 19 June 1900 in Davos, Switzerland
Resigned as Director of the China Inland Mission November 1902
Jane Elizabeth "Jennie" Faulding died 31 July 1904 in Les Chevalleyres, Switzerland

Eleventh and final time in China (1905) 
 Sailed to US (New York City) aboard the  15 February 1905 in Liverpool, Lancashire, England. Arrived aboard the RMS Baltic March 1905 in New York City
Sailed to China from San Francisco, 23 March 1905. Arrived 17 April 1905 in Shanghai, China
 Died 3 June 1905 in Changsha, Hunan, China.  Buried 9 June 1905 in Protestant Cemetery (no longer existing) in Zhenjiang, Jiangsu, China

Re-burial 
Remains re-buried at a local church in Zhenjiang, after 28 August 2013.

Works
 .
 China's Spiritual Need and Claims (1865)
 China & the Chinese an address to the Young (1865)
 China's Millions
 .
 A Retrospect (1894)
 After Thirty Years (1895)
 Separation and Service (1898)
 A Ribband of Blue And Other Bible Studies (1899)

Archives
Manuscripts and letters relating to James Hudson Taylor are held as part of the China Inland Mission collection by the Archives of the School of Oriental and African Studies in London.

Honours
Taylor House in YMCA of Hong Kong Christian College, which was founded by YMCA of Hong Kong, was named in commemoration of Taylor.

References

Bibliography 
 
 
 
 
 
 
 
 
 
 .
 
 .
 .
 . Has a chapter on Hudson Taylor's marriage.
 
 
 
 
 
 
 
 .
 .

External links

 
 
 
 Christian Biography Resources
 Spurgeon's "Interviews with Three of the King's Captains"
 Genealogy.com: The family of James Hudson Taylor
 Hudson Taylor Centre for Chinese Ministries, Tyndale University College and Seminary, Toronto, ON
 

1832 births
1905 deaths
Alumni of the London Hospital Medical College
Translators of the Bible into Chinese
British expatriates in China
British people of the Boxer Rebellion
British evangelicals
English evangelicals
Christian medical missionaries
Protestant missionaries in China
Christian writers
English Baptist ministers
English Protestant missionaries
Victorian writers
19th-century English medical doctors
19th-century British writers
People from Barnsley
British Plymouth Brethren
Hudson
Missionary linguists